The Recording Studio is a 2019 Australian TV series broadcast nationally by the ABC. Narrated by Megan Washington it brings everyday Australians into a professional recording studio to record a song.

The music from the series won the 2019 ARIA Award for Best Original Soundtrack, Cast or Show Album.

References

External links
The Recording Studio

ARIA Award winners
Australian Broadcasting Corporation original programming